The pagoda slitshell, scientific name †Gyrotoma pagoda, was a species of freshwater snail, a gastropod in the family Pleuroceridae. This species was endemic to the United States. It is now extinct.

References

Pleuroceridae
Extinct gastropods
Gastropods described in 1845
Taxonomy articles created by Polbot